Warren B. Burton (November 23, 1800June 6, 1866) was an American clergyman and writer who wrote on phrenology, transcendentalism, and education.

References

External links
 

1800 births
1866 deaths
American education writers
19th-century American clergy